Second Kuril Strait is a strait located at , which separates the islands of Paramushir and Shumshu in the Kuril Islands, Russia.

Straits of the Kuril Islands
Paramushir
Shumshu